Nivankyul was a rural locality (an inhabited locality) in Kolsky District of Murmansk Oblast, Russia. It was abolished by the Law of Murmansk Oblast #995-01-ZMO of July 2, 2008.

References

Abolished inhabited localities in Murmansk Oblast